Snake & Crane Arts of Shaolin is a 1978 Hong Kong action film directed by Chen Chi Hwa and starring Jackie Chan. It was released by the Lo Wei Motion Picture Company, a subsidiary of Golden Harvest. Along with Tu Wi Ho, Chen was also the film's stunt co-ordinator.

Plot
Hsu Ying Fung quickly makes it known (with some help) that he possesses the "Eight Steps of the Snake and Crane", a martial arts manual illustrating the ultimate fighting style. The book was written by eight Shaolin masters shortly before their disappearance, and Hsu is suspected of killing them, or at least knowing what happened. In reality, Hsu is looking for the man responsible for the masters' disappearance, whom he will know by a certain mark.

After several fights, and encounters with the leaders of many fighting clans (all of whom want the book and are willing to offer a variety of things for it), Hsu is betrayed, hurt, and eventually captured. He escapes with an unlikely ally in tow, while the rest of the clan leaders, having put aside their differences, search high and low for him. Eventually Hsu finds the man with the mark, the other clan leaders learn the fate of the Shaolin masters, and in an epic fight involving the Snake and Crane style, Hsu defeats the villain.

Cast
 Jackie Chan as Hsu Yin-Fung (credited as Jacky Chan)
 Nora Miao as Tang Pin-Er

Box office
In Hong Kong, the film grossed HK662,851.30. Overseas, the film sold 161,021 tickets in Seoul City (South Korea) and 345,312 tickets in France (where it released in 1984), for a combined  tickets sold overseas in Seoul and France.

Home media
 In February 2001, Seven 7 released the French theatrical cut on DVD, entitled Le Magnifique. The film had the original aspect ratio of 2.35:1, but contained no English-language options or subtitles.
 In September 2001, Eastern Heroes released the film on DVD in the UK. This version was a shorter cut, and was cropped from 2.35:1 into 1.85:1. It also contained an English dub only.
 In March 2002, Columbia Tri-Star released the film in the US on DVD in 2.35:1 with both an English dub and the original Mandarin soundtrack. However, this version was dubtitled and missing over 5 minutes of footage.
 In February 2006, Universal Japan released the film in Japan on DVD. It was uncut for the first time on DVD, and in 2.35:1 ratio, with a Mandarin soundtrack. However, this release featured no English subtitles.
 In May 2007, UK company Hong Kong Legends released the most complete English-friendly version of the film to date on DVD. It was fully uncut, presented in 2.35:1, and included an English dub and the original Mandarin soundtrack with newly translated English subtitles. However, the Mandarin "mono" is a downmix from the 5.1 remix.
 In November 2008, Media Movies and More released the film on DVD in Pan and scan format with English dubbing.
 Dragon Dynasty had intended to release a Region 1 DVD of the film, but the release has been postponed indefinitely.
 A Region B Blu-ray version of the film was released on February 11, 2019 by 88 Films UK. This version was made from a 2K restoration and contains the original Mandarin track along with Cantonese and English audio options. A subsequent Deluxe Collector Edition was released by 88Films in January 2023, with a hardback book and rigid slipcase.

See also
 Jackie Chan filmography
 List of Hong Kong films
 List of martial arts films

References

External links

Snake & Crane Arts of Shaolin blu ray

1978 films
1978 action films
1978 martial arts films
Hong Kong martial arts films
Kung fu films
1970s Mandarin-language films
Films directed by Chen Chi-hwa
1970s Hong Kong films